Balkadu is a 2015 Indian Marathi language film. The film stars Umesh Kamat, Neha Pendse and Prasad Oak in lead roles and stars Supriya Pathare, Tiku Talsania, Pushkar Shrotri, Anand Ingale in supporting roles. Balkadu was directed by Atul Kale and produced by Swapna Patker. Balkadu is loosely expected to be based on the ideologies of late Indian politician Bal Thackeray, the film contains voice clippings of Thackeray's political career.

Cast 
 Umesh Kamat as Balkrishna Patil
 Neha Pendse as Sai
 Prasad Oak 
 Supriya Pathare as Balkrishna's mother
 Pushkar Shrotri as Nandu Patil, Balkrishna's father (Special appearance)
 Mahesh Shetty as Jehangir Singh
 Anand Ingale
 Tiku Talsania as Principal
 Bhalchandra Kadam as Peon
 Atul Kale as Local Political Leader who is slapped by Nandu Patil (Guest Role)

Production

Casting 
Tiku Talsania, who has acted previously in Bollywood movies like Andaz Apna Apna and Ishq was signed on for the film as his debut in the Marathi cinema. Tiku portrays the role of a school principal in the film.

Music 
Soundtrack for Balkadu was composed by the duo Ajit-Samir who have worked on Kaksparsh previously and have contributed to movies like Me Shivajiraje Bhosale Boltoy as the trio Ajit-Atul-Sameer.

Release 
Balkadu released on the birth anniversary of late Balasaheb Thackeray on 23 January 2015.

Critical reception 
Upon release, Balkadu opened to negative reviews from critics. Koimoi.com rated the film with one star out of five saying "Other than enjoying his cartoons at the start of the film, there is nothing that wooed me." Pune Mirror gave the film 2 stars out of five,  stating "I am sure his [Balasaheb's] life and ideology can be well expressed in a film. Sadly, Balkadu is not that film. At best, Balkadu is a case of wishful thinking. At worst, it's a propaganda the oSena does not need at the moment."

References

External links 
 

Bal Thackeray
2015 films
2010s Marathi-language films